Labour Friends of Israel (LFI) is a group in the Parliament of the United Kingdom  that promotes support for a strong bilateral relationship between Britain and Israel, and seeks to strengthen ties between the British Labour Party and the Israeli Labor Party. LFI says it supports a two-state solution to the Israeli–Palestinian conflict, with Israel recognised and secure within its borders, and the establishment of a viable Palestinian state. , it comprises around one quarter of the Parliamentary Labour Party and one third of the Shadow Cabinet.

History
LFI was founded at the 1957 Labour Party Conference. Its membership is organised into local branches. Seeking to strengthen the bond between the Labour Party and the Israeli Labor Party, it organises meetings of senior figures in both the UK and Israel.

2000–2015
In 2003, LFI described itself as "a Westminster based lobby group working within the British Labour Party to promote the State of Israel". 
It has been described as "less unquestioning in its support of the Israeli government than the Conservative Friends of Israel". Between 2001 and 2009, LFI sponsored more than 60 MPs to visit Israel, more than any other group.

In 2010, Jennifer Gerber, previously director of Progress and before that, special advisor to Andy Burnham, was appointed director.

In 2011, LFI adopted a new strategy of becoming a wider membership organisation and of operating under the slogan "Working Towards a Two-State Solution".

In 2011, John Woodcock was appointed chair, followed in May 2013 by Dame Anne McGuire and, in 2015, Joan Ryan.

In 2014, Adrian Cohen, a corporate lawyer, the chair of the London Jewish Forum, a trustee of the Jewish Leadership Council and a deputy of the Board of Deputies of British Jews, was appointed Lay Chair.

2016 onwards
With the ascent to the leadership of the Labour Party, in September 2015, of Jeremy Corbyn, who has a history of support for Palestinians, the relationship between the LFI and the party leadership deteriorated.

LFI had been depleted of Parliamentary supporters who had lost their seats at the 2015 general election. In 2016, LFI announced it had trebled its number of Parliamentary supporters, stating that 65 MPs had pledged to back the group, at a time when many MPs rebelled against the leadership of the party. LFI re-branded itself as "Labour Friends of Israel: For Israel, For Palestine, For Peace", created a Young LFI group, and stated it would support the Alliance for Middle East Peace’s international fund.

In early 2017, Al Jazeera released a four-part documentary entitled The Lobby, which investigated aspects of the Israel lobby in the United Kingdom, particularly relating to the Labour Party. A member of Israeli embassy staff, Shai Masot, was recorded "plotting" to take down British MPs who favour recognition of a Palestinian state; links to the Labour Friends of Israel were put under the spotlight, including a reference to the availability of £1m from the Israeli government.

In March 2018, supporters of LFI, along with the Board of Deputies of British Jews and the Jewish Leadership Council, took part in a protest critical of the Corbyn leadership, stating that antisemitism was present in the Labour Party.

In February 2019, after having lost a vote of no confidence by her local constituency Labour Party, Joan Ryan resigned from the Labour Party to join the recently formed The Independent Group but retained her position as Chair of LFI. She became Honorary President in August 2019 and Dame Louise Ellman succeeded her as Parliamentary Chair. In October 2019, Ellman resigned from the Labour Party. Neither stood for reelection in the 2019 general election. However, despite resigning from the Labour Party, they remained members of LFI.

As of July 2020, around a quarter of the Parliamentary Labour Party and a third of the shadow cabinet were members of the group. In September 2020, Jennifer Gerber stepped down as director and was replaced by Michael Rubin. In September 2020, LFI doubled its number of vice-chairs to 11, with the addition of: Rosie Cooper, Chris Evans, Dame Diana Johnson, Peter Kyle, Conor McGinn  and Catherine McKinnell.

Related groups
The Yigal Allon Educational Trust, founded in 1985 by former Prime Minister Harold Wilson, Ian Mikardo MP, Lord Glenamara and others, has supported Labour Friends of Israel.

Parliamentary supporters of LFI
As of February 2022, the Officers, sitting MPs, Lords and former members who were supporters of LFI are set out below.

Officers
Labour (unless otherwise stated)

 Steve McCabe: Chair 
 Rosie Cooper
 Chris Evans
 Sharon Hodgson
 Diana Johnson
 Peter Kyle
 Pat McFadden
 Conor McGinn
 Catherine McKinnell
 Rachel Reeves
 John Spellar
 Meta Ramsay, Baroness Ramsay of Cartvale
 Jonathan Reynolds

Sitting MPs
Labour (unless otherwise stated)

 Mike Amesbury
 Fleur Anderson
 Hilary Benn
 Nick Brown
 Chris Bryant
 Liam Byrne
 Neil Coyle
 Feryal Clark
 Yvette Cooper
 Jon Cruddas
 Janet Daby
 Wayne David
 Angela Eagle
 Maria Eagle
 Chris Elmore
 Florence Eshalomi
 Barry Gardiner
 Preet Gill
 Mary Glindon
 Lilian Greenwood
 Nia Griffith
 Andrew Gwynne
 Carolyn Harris
 Fabian Hamilton
 Margaret Hodge
 George Howarth
 Dan Jarvis
 Darren Jones
 Kevan Jones
 Mike Kane
 Liz Kendall
 David Lammy
 Kim Leadbeater
 Chris Matheson
 Siobhain McDonagh
 Stephen Morgan
 Alex Norris
 Taiwo Owatemi
 Toby Perkins
 Jess Phillips
 Bridget Phillipson 
 Lucy Powell
 Virendra Sharma 
 Barry Sheerman
 Jeff Smith
 Karin Smyth
 Keir Starmer
 Wes Streeting
 Graham Stringer
 Gareth Thomas
 Emily Thornberry
 Karl Turner
 Derek Twigg
 Christian Wakeford
 Rosie Winterton

Sitting Lords
Labour (unless otherwise stated)

Donald Anderson, Baron Anderson of Swansea
Baroness Armstrong of Hill Top
Jeremy Beecham, Baron Beecham
Lord Blunkett
Lord Boateng
Lord Clarke of Hampstead
Lord Collins of Highbury
Baroness Crawley
Lord Desai
Lord Donoughue
Lord Foulkes of Cumnock
Baroness Gale 
Lord Grantchester
Lord Hain
Lord Harrison
Lord Haskel
Baroness Hayter of Kentish Town
Lord Hughes of Woodside
Lord Hunt of Kings Heath
Baroness Kennedy of Cradley
Lord Kennedy of Southwark
Baroness Kinnock of Holyhead
Lord Levy
Baroness Liddell of Coatdyke
Lord Livermore
John Maxton
Paul Murphy, Baron Murphy of Torfaen
Lord Rooker
Lord Stone of Blackheath
Lord Tomlinson
Lord Touhig
Lord Turnberg (Independent)
Lord Watts
Lord Winston
Lord Wood of Anfield
Lord Young of Norwood Green

Former members
 David Abrahams, former Treasurer
 Lord Archer of Sandwell
 Sir Stuart Bell
 Luciana Berger, former Director of LFI
 Tony Blair, former Prime Minister
 Gordon Brown, former Prime Minister
 Stephen Byers, former Secretary of State for Trade and Industry
 Andrew Dismore
 Michael Dugher
 Derek Foster
 Anthony Greenwood, first Chair of LFI (1957)
 Baroness Hayman
 Joan Humble
 Barbara Keeley
 Jane Kennedy, Chair of LFI (2007)
 Ivan Lewis, former Vice-Chair of LFI
 Lord Macdonald of Tradeston
 Denis MacShane
 Michael McCann, Vice-Chair of LFI
 Anne McGuire, Chair of LFI (2013)
 Jonathan Mendelsohn, former Chair of LFI (2002)
 Alun Michael, former Leader of the Welsh Labour Party
 Andrew Miller
 Jim Murphy, former Chair of LFI (2001), former Secretary of State for Scotland
 Dan Norris
 Nick Palmer
 James Purnell, former Chair of LFI, former Secretary of State for Work and Pensions
 John Reid, former Home Secretary (2007)
 Terry Rooney
 Dari Taylor
 Gary Titley
 Glenis Willmott, Vice Chair of LFI
 Lord Winston
 John Woodcock
 Iain Wright, former Chair of LFI (2006)
 Lord Young of Norwood Green

See also
 Conservative Friends of Israel
 European Friends of Israel
 Friends of Israel Initiative
 Israel lobby in the United Kingdom
 Israel lobby in the United States
 Jewish Labour Movement 
 Jewish lobby
 Jewish Voice for Labour
 Labour Friends of Palestine & the Middle East
 Liberal Democrat Friends of Israel
 Northern Ireland Friends of Israel

References

External links
 Official website
 
 
 
 Speech by Gordon Brown to the LFI Annual Reception, Prime Minister Gordon Brown, 25 September 2007

 
1957 establishments in the United Kingdom
Israel friendship associations
Israel–United Kingdom relations
Jewish British history
Lobbying in the United Kingdom
Organisations associated with the Labour Party (UK)
Organizations established in 1957
Political advocacy groups in the United Kingdom
Two-state solution
United Kingdom friendship associations